Manuel Hernández may refer to:

 Manuel Hernández (motorcycle racer)
 Manuel Hernández (Uruguayan footballer) (born 1970), former Uruguayan footballer
 Manuel Hernandez (soccer) (born 1948), retired Spanish-American soccer forward
 Manuel Hernández, Sr.
 Manuel 'Nay' Hernandez, professional baseball player